Ingleburn High School is a government-funded comprehensive co-educational secondary day school, located in Ingleburn, a south-western suburb of Sydney, New South Wales, Australia.

Overview 
The school follows the New South Wales Education Standards Authority curriculum, which is provided to all schools in NSW. The School's motto is "Your School, Your Future". In 2008, the school consisted of 63.6 teaching staff and approximately 880 students.

Of the year 7 cohort, 2007, 50% met national numeracy benchmarks.

The 2009 year 9 cohort ranked below or substantially below both similar schools and all Australian schools in all performance areas (reading, writing, grammar & punctuation and numeracy) except for spelling in which the cohort performed close to similar and all Australian schools.

For 2009, Ingleburn High School was ranked 455 out of 555 NSW secondary schools by The Sydney Morning Herald, placing it in the bottom 20% of schools for which data was available.

In 2004, the student attendance rate for years 7 to 10 was below the district and state averages.
In the years 2005, 2006, 2007 and 2008, the student attendance rate for years 7 to 10 and for years 11 to 12 were below the state averages. In 2008, the staff attendance rate was 93.9%.

There are programmes to support students of specific non-European origins. 
One programme in particular involves a "federally funded" "Aboriginal Education Worker" whose role will be to work with only Aboriginal students. The reason for this staff member is that the State has made it compulsory that only students of Aboriginal origin must have an "Individual Education Plan". Other programmes available to all students include the school newsletter voucher programme in which students who "collect 3 vouchers from different newsletters" may redeem their vouchers for a bronze award from a deputy principal.

The school's latest programme is PBIS or "Positive Behavior In School"; a programme developed by the "U.S. Office of Special Education Programs". The programme occupies students' time every fortnight requiring students to "focus on the positive behavioural expectations...of all students". Workshops includes topics such as "discussing with students our expectations regarding...moving around and through corridors and walkways". This programme also occupies staff time in "development sessions".

Alumni 
Michele Bruniges - Secretary of Department of Education, Skills and Employment
Meg Lees - former head of the Australian Democrats
Glenn Williams - baseball player

See also 

 List of government schools in Sydney
 Education in Australia

References

External links
Ingleburn High School Website

Public high schools in Sydney
Ingleburn, New South Wales
Educational institutions established in 1960
1960 establishments in Australia